Denis Clemente (born April 10, 1986 in Bayamón, Puerto Rico) is a Puerto Rican professional basketball player for the Brujos de Guayama of the Baloncesto Superior Nacional (BSN). He played collegiately in the United States with the Kansas State University Wildcats, which he graduated from in 2010. He is a 6'1, 175 pound combo guard. 

Clemente led Kansas State to the Elite 8 round of the 2010 NCAA Tournament before losing to the Butler Bulldogs. Clemente entered the 2010 NBA Draft but went undrafted, and later played in the NBA Summer League with the Charlotte Bobcats, but was cut prior to training camp. In December 2010 he signed with Greek club Maroussi BC. In September 2011 he signed with Slovak club BK Bemaco SPU Nitra. In 2011 he was selected Rookie of the Year in Puerto Rico's Professional league. He has also had a stint playing professional basketball in Mexico.

Personal life
He is the second cousin of Major League Baseball Hall of Fame player Roberto Clemente.

References

External links
Denis Clemente at RealGM
Stats in the Baloncesto Superior Nacional (Puerto Rico's Professional league)

1986 births
Living people
Caciques de Humacao players
Capitanes de Arecibo players
Fuerza Regia de Monterrey players
Kansas State Wildcats men's basketball players
Maroussi B.C. players
Miami Hurricanes men's basketball players
Mineros de Zacatecas (basketball) players
Sportspeople from Bayamón, Puerto Rico
Pioneros de Quintana Roo players
Point guards
Puerto Rican men's basketball players
Puerto Rican expatriate basketball people in Israel
Puerto Rican expatriate basketball people in Italy
Puerto Rican expatriate basketball people in Mexico
Puerto Rican expatriate basketball people in Slovakia
Reyer Venezia players
Shooting guards
Victoria Libertas Pallacanestro players